Wingham may refer to:

Places
 Wingham, Kent, a village in England
River Wingham, a river flowing through Wingham, Kent, England
 Wingham, New South Wales in Australia
St Andrew's Presbyterian Church, Wingham, Australia
 Wingham, Ontario in Huron County, Canada
Wingham Bulls, a senior hockey team based out of Wingham, Ontario, Canada
Wingham/Richard W. LeVan Aerodrome, near Wingham, Ontario
Wingham Ironmen, an ice hockey team in Wingham, Ontario

People with the surname
Duncan Wingham, Professor of Climate Physics at University College London
Henry Wingham, Lord Chancellor of England (1255–1260) and Bishop of London
Thomas Wingham (1846-1893), English musician, known as a teacher